Pamela Marrone is a serial entrepreneur in agriculture biotechnology and biological pesticides. She is one of 22 women who founded and led companies to be listed on public stock exchanges  She held more than 500 patents. She also serves on a number of company boards and is on serval advisory councils. 

She currently live in Davis, California with her husband, Mick Rogers.

Early Life and Education 
Pamela grow up in southern Connecticut. Pamela received her bachelor of science in Entomology with honors and distinction from Cornell University in 1978 and a doctor of philosophy in Entomology with specialization from North Carolina State University 1983. She led the insect biology and control groups in Monsanto from 1983 to 1990 and was recruited by Novo Nordisk to start a biopesticide subsidiary.

Career

Entotech, Inc 
Pamela served as president and business unit head for Entotech, a Novo Nordisk subsidiary from 1990 to 1995 before it was sold to Abbott.

AgraQuest, Inc 
Pamela founded AgraQuest in 1995. She served as CEO, Chairman and President until 2006 when it is acquired by Bayer Crop Science for $425 million plus milestone payment.

Marrone Bio Innovations, Inc 
Pamela founded Marrone Bio Innovations (NASDAQ: MBII), a pest management and plant health company in 2006. It went public on NASDAQ in 2013. She stepped down as CEO in 2022.

Invasive Species Control Corporation and Foundation 
Pamela and former Marrone Bio Innovation president Jim Boyd launched Invasive Species Foundation and Invasive Species Control Corp in 2022.

Award and Recognition

References 

Year of birth missing (living people)
Living people
Cornell University alumni